Canyon Diablo may refer to:

 Canyon Diablo (canyon), Arizona, U.S.
 Canyon Diablo (meteorite), fragments found in Meteor Crater near the canyon
 Canyon Diablo Crater, former name of Meteor Crater
 Canyon Diablo, Arizona, a ghost town near the canyon
 Canyon Diablo Bridge, which crosses the canyon near the ghost town of Two Guns
 Canyon Diablo shootout, a 1905 gunfight at the canyon

See also
Diablo Canyon (disambiguation)